Ratsitatanina, also known as Ratsitatane (1790-1822) was a Malagasy nobleman. He was the nephew of King Radama I and the son of minister Andriamambavola. The first Prime Minister of Madagascar Andriamihaja is believed to be his son.

Ratsitatanina was exiled from Madagascar to the island of British Mauritius aboard vessel Menai. He landed in Mauritius on 24 December 1821 and was imprisoned, although he was given some freedom. The British administrators had plans to further exile him to the island of Rodrigues.  However Ratsitatanina escaped and was later captured by a private militia of maroon-hunters led by Franco-Mauritian lawyer and politician Adrien d'Épinay. Ratsitatanina and his accomplices were tried for plotting to kill prominent people in Mauritius. He was beheaded at Plaine Verte on Monday 15 April 1822.

References

Malagasy politicians
People exiled to Mauritius
People executed by Mauritius by decapitation
1822 deaths
Executed Malagasy people